Irena Boclincă (born 4 December 1980) is a theater actress from Moldova who currently works and lives in Bucharest, Romania.

Biography 
Irena Boclincă was born on 4 December 1980 in Zăicani, in Moldova. She is since December 2018 in a relationship with Ștefan Nedelcu, having formerly been married to stylist Valentin Vicol.

Additionally, she also stood out in the Moldovan satirical show Shaving Hour, on Jurnal TV, presented by the Moldovan actors Constantin Cheianu and Anatol Durbală, where she played the role of the character Simona.

In February 2019, she became known to the general public in Romania due to her appearance on the show  on Antena 1 in Bucharest, where she imitated Viorica Dăncilă, the then Prime Minister of Romania. On 1 June of the same year, she won the season 6 of iUmor. However, she donated the prize, worth around 20,000 euros, to competitor Vasi Borcan, who was immobilized in a wheelchair.

References 

1980 births
Romanian stage actresses
Moldovan film actresses
Romanian television actresses
Moldovan television actresses
Moldovan television presenters
Living people